Chico Pinheiro  is a Brazilian guitarist, composer, and arranger. He has played with other guitarists including Anthony Wilson, Julian Lage and Steve Cardenas. He is a leading figure of modern jazz in Brazil.

His music has been well-received by critics in Brazil, and his work has featured vocalist Luciana Alves.

Discography 
 2008 Nova with Anthony Wilson          
 2010 There's A Storm Inside
 2020 CITY OF DREAMS

External links

References 

Brazilian jazz guitarists
Living people
Year of birth missing (living people)
Sunnyside Records artists